is a subway station on the  Fukuoka City Subway Nanakuma Line in Jōnan-ku, Fukuoka in Japan.  This station's symbol mark means  bridge's overpass with two clouds which looks like Befu's initials .

Lines 
Fukuoka City Subway
Nanakuma Line

Platforms

Vicinity
Route 202
Jōnan Ward office
Jōnan Ward Public health center
Lawson
7-Eleven
Fukuoka Municipal ER Jōnan branch
Nakamura Gakuen University
Nakamura Gakuen Girls High School

History
February 3, 2005: Opening of the station

References

Railway stations in Japan opened in 2005
Railway stations in Fukuoka Prefecture
Nanakuma Line